Doin' Time is a 1985 American comedy film directed by George Mendeluk and written by Franelle Silver, Ron Zwang and Dee Caruso. The film stars Jeff Altman, Henry Bal, Gene Bell, Big Yank, Simmy Bow, Drew Bundini Brown and David Lee Bynum. The film was released by Warner Bros. on May 19, 1985.

Plot
The warden of John Dillinger Memorial Penitentiary begins a series of prison reforms that cut down on the fun and games that the prisoners had been enjoying and eventually the convicts decide a little revenge is in order.

Cast

References

External links 
 
 
Doin' Time at BFI
Doin' Time at Letterbox DVD

1985 films
Warner Bros. films
American prison comedy films
1985 comedy films
The Ladd Company films
Films scored by Charles Fox
Films with screenplays by Dee Caruso
1980s English-language films
Films directed by George Mendeluk
1980s American films